Leena Jumani is an Indian actress and model, best known as Tanushree "Tanu" Mehta in Kumkum Bhagya.

She played Khemi, a poor village girl, in the television series Bandini. This was followed with the role of Suhasi in the show Koi Aane Ko Hai. She appeared in a special episode of Tujh Sang Preet Lagai Sajna and in Aahat, and had a cameo in Tere Liye. Next, she played the lead role of Pakhi in Ganga Kii Dheej. More recently, she played the female lead role of Ira in Chhoti Si Zindagi. Her other roles include Paridhi in Punar Vivah, Piya in Piya Ka Ghar Pyaara Lage and Antara in Amita Ka Amit. She played the role of main antagonist Tanushree (Tanu) in Kumkum Bhagya. She left the show in 2019 however returned in 2021 and is currently working in that project. She also played the lead role in Vikram Bhatt's Maaya 2 opposite Priyal Gor. She played a part in the film Himmatwala and also took part in the reality show Madventures Pakistan. Jumani was raised in Ahmedabad, Gujarat, India. In December 2013, she got engaged to Rahul Sachdeva, a US-based businessman.

Filmography

Television 
 2009: Koi Ane ko Hai as Suhasi
 2009–2010: Bandini
 2009: Bayttaab Dil Kee Tamanna Hai
 2010: Shubh Vivah
 2010: Tujh Sang Preet Lagai Sajna
 2010: Aahat
 2010: Tere Liye 
 2010–2011: Ganga Kii Dheej as Paakhi
 2011: Ek Nayi Chhoti Si Zindagi as Ira Shyam / Kajal 
 2012: Adaalat
 2012: Hum Ne Li Hai- Shapath
 2012–2013: Punar Vivah as Bhavani / Paridhi
 2012:Kairi 
 2013: Madventures - Ary Digital
 2013: Piya Ka Ghar Pyaara Lage as Piya Nanavati
 2013: Amita Ka Amit
 2013: Gustakh Dil
 2014–2019,2021-2022: Kumkum Bhagya as Tanushri Mehta (Tanu)
 2016: Kavach...Kaali Shaktiyon Se as a woman under possession of an evil spirit in the first episode(cameo)
2017-2018: Kundali Bhagya as Tanushri Mehta 
 2018: Mistresses (Indian TV Series) as Sofia
2020: Haiwaan - The Monster as Disha
2022: Appnapan – Badalte Rishton Ka Bandhan as Sonali

Films 
 2013: Himmatwala as Padma
 2014: Sathiyo Chalyo Khodaldham
 2018: 'Pardesi Dhola'
 2021: X6
 2021: Ek Anjaan Rishtey Ka Guilt
 2022: Ek Anjaan Rishtey Ka Guilt 2
 2022: Hey Kem Chho London

Web series 
 2018: Maaya 2 as Ruhi Ahuja Simmi's Friend vb on the web
 2021: Bisaat MX PLAYER
2021: Paro
2021: Client no. 7

References

External links

 
 
 

Sindhi people
Actresses from Ahmedabad
Living people
Indian television actresses
Indian soap opera actresses
Actresses in Gujarati cinema
21st-century Indian actresses
Actresses in Hindi television
1990 births
Actors from Mumbai